The Grubbiaceae are a family of flowering plants endemic to the Cape floristic region of South Africa. The family includes five species of leathery-leaved shrubs in two genera, Grubbia and Strobilocarpus. They are commonly known as sillyberry.

References

Cornales
Asterid families
Endemic flora of South Africa